This is intended to be a complete list of the properties and districts on the National Register of Historic Places in Methuen, Massachusetts, United States. The locations of National Register properties and districts for which the latitude and longitude coordinates are included below, may be seen in an online map.

Essex County, of which Methuen is a part, is the location of 471 properties and districts listed on the National Register. Methuen itself is the location of 45 of these properties and districts.

Current listings

|}

See also

 List of National Historic Landmarks in Massachusetts
 National Register of Historic Places listings in Essex County, Massachusetts
 National Register of Historic Places listings in Massachusetts

References

 
Methuen
 
Methuen, Massachusetts